Ivan Gerasimovich Lapikov (Russian: Иван Герасимович Лапиков; 7 July 1922 – 2 May 1993) was a Soviet and Russian actor. People's Artist of the USSR (1982).

Biography
Lapikov was born in the village of Gorny Balykley, near Tsaritsyn (now – Dubovsky District, Volgograd Oblast). He spent his childhood in Stalingrad.

In 1939, he enrolled in drama school in Kharkov, where he studied for the following two years. After the World War II began, Ivan started to work in the Gorky Drama Theater (Stalingrad). There he worked until he removed to Moscow in 1963. In Moscow Lapikov joined the Film Actor's Theater-Studio.

His first role in cinema was in the film The Reserve Player (1954). After The Chairman (1964 film) by Alexey Saltykov (1964), where the actor had played the brother of the lead character, Lapikov became famous. Later he created a whole gallery of the Russian characters: Kirill in Andrei Rublev, Lyagavy in The Brothers Karamazov, Pankrat Nazarov in Eternal Call, and many other roles.

Filmography

Awards
 Honored Artist of the RSFSR (1965)
People's Artist of the RSFSR (1974)
People's Artist of the USSR (1982)
 USSR State Prize (1979)
 Lenin Komsomol Prize (1979)
 Vasilyev Brothers State Prize of the RSFSR - 1973

Legacy
 The Lapikov Museum, in the village of Gorny Balykley
 Memorial plaque to Ivan Lapikov at the house in Volgograd where he lived

References

External links

1922 births
1993 deaths
People from Volgograd Oblast
Russian male film actors
Soviet male film actors
Honored Artists of the RSFSR
People's Artists of the RSFSR
People's Artists of the USSR
Recipients of the USSR State Prize
Recipients of the Lenin Komsomol Prize
Recipients of the Vasilyev Brothers State Prize of the RSFSR
Burials at Vagankovo Cemetery